Iceland (1942) is a 20th Century Fox musical film directed by H. Bruce Humberstone set in Iceland, starring skater Sonja Henie and John Payne as a U.S. Marine posted in Iceland during World War II. The film was titled Katina in Great Britain and Marriage on Ice in Australia.

Fox reteamed their two leads and director from the previous year's musical Sun Valley Serenade and set the story in the then contemporary American Marine landing and occupation of Iceland in 1941. Payne had previously played a Marine in Fox's To the Shores of Tripoli also directed by Humberstone. Among the songs are "There Will Never Be Another You" and "You Can't Say No to a Soldier".

Some Icelanders protested against the film for its depiction of Marines winning away the local women. Henie's on-ice partner during the filmed skating sequences was 1940/41 U.S. Champion Eugene Turner.

Cast
 Sonja Henie as Katina Jonsdottir
 John Payne as Capt. James Murfin
 Jack Oakie as Slip Riggs
 Felix Bressart as Papa Jonsdottir
 Sterling Holloway as Sverdrup Svenssen
 Osa Massen as Helga Jonsdottir
 Joan Merrill as Adele Wynn
 Fritz Feld as Herr Tegnar
 Sammy Kaye and His Orchestra as Themselves
 Louis Adlon as Valtyr Olafson (credited as Duke Adlon)

Reception
Reviewer Dennis Schwartz gave the film a C+ rating, describing it as "entertaining but superficial" while giving credit to its direction and its songs.

Notes

External links
 Iceland at IMDB
 

1942 films
Films set in Iceland
Films about music and musicians
20th Century Fox films
Films directed by H. Bruce Humberstone
Films about the United States Marine Corps
American black-and-white films
1940s English-language films
Figure skating films
1942 musical films
American musical films
1940s American films